Scottish Ice Hockey, abbreviated to SIH, (formerly the Scottish Ice Hockey Association, abbreviated to SIHA) is responsible for the administration of all ice hockey in Scotland, with the exception of Scotland's Elite Ice Hockey League teams (currently Glasgow Clan, Fife Flyers and Dundee Stars).

The leagues and areas for which SIH are responsible for are:
Scottish Premier Hockey League
Scottish National League
Women's ice hockey
SRIHC Recreational ice hockey Conference
Junior ice hockey

They are also responsible for running coaching courses and the training and registration of on and off-ice officials.

References

External links
Scottish Ice Hockey Association official website
Scottish National League official website

Ice hockey in Scotland
Ice hockey
Scotland
Ice hockey governing bodies in the United Kingdom